The Tax1 is a PDZ domain containing oncoprotein encoded by HTLV-1.

References

Proteins